Beauty & the Briefcase is a 2010 American romantic comedy television film directed by Gil Junger, based on the novel Diary of a Working Girl by Daniella Brodsky. The film stars Hilary Duff as a fashion journalist who works undercover to write an article on dating businessmen. It premiered on ABC Family on April 18, 2010.

Plot
Joanne, a fashion photographer, helps her friend Lane Daniels (Hilary Duff), an aspiring writer, get in to see Kate White, the primary editor at Cosmopolitan magazine, to pitch a story idea - which does not go well. On the way out the door, Lane tells Kate about her elaborate check-list and how hard it is to find a good man, which leads to Kate assigning Lane the task of joining the business world to find a man who checks all the criteria of her "list", amongst all those eligible "downtown" bachelors, and writing an article about that. She is to go undercover and look for her "magic man" (one for whom she has a lengthy checklist of desirable attributes, as opposed to her friend Joanne's checklist, which consists of 1. breathing and 2. cute). With a fraudulent résumé, Lane bluffs, bumbles, and sabotages her way into getting an administrative assistant position in the Corporate Strategic Planning department of a major investment firm. She is to work for Tom Rinehart (Michael McMillian), Managing Director, who is a bit of a quirky 'stick in the mud' when it comes to personal 'risk-taking'.

Lane sets about to finding men she can date, and does so, without quick success at her goal. One night, she and Joanne bump into Liam at a bar, and she is immediately impressed. He is handsome, British, polite, witty, spontaneous, a world traveler, etc. - having most of the qualities on her checklist. She goes on a date with Liam and is seriously interested. But she also has a previously planned date with Seth, a co-worker. They go out, but Seth isn't Liam.

Meanwhile, Tom discovers Lane's qualifications for the job are non-existent, but she is trying to do the work, so he warns her to stop lying and "get back to work". A more immediate problem is that Kate told Lane to date only businessmen in suits, which Liam is not. Kate tells Lane to focus on Seth, but Lane decides to continue seeing Liam, while using the name and persona of Seth in her article. One night, Lane and a friend (Brandi Coleman), bump into Tom at the corner market. The friend thinks he's cute, but Lane tells her that he has a girlfriend, and she has not thought of him as a prospect. Following Kate's directive, Lane has lunch with Seth at work one day, but is thinking about Liam.

Due to her 'fashion sense', Lane is assigned to handle the visuals for the upcoming big meeting with the boss. She also discovers Tom is no longer with his demanding girlfriend Whitney. Tom asks Lane to help him with a 'makeover' for the big meeting, so they go out to shop and have fun doing so - Lane gets him to buy a blue shirt that brings out his eyes instead of his usual plain white dress shirts, along with a new tie, shoes, and handsome suit.

While Lane is off to pick up mock-ups of the visuals at the printer, Tom, on returning to the office, accidentally finds Lane's article. When she returns, he angrily confronts her (and Seth) about her deception. Seth is totally confused. She leaves, thinking she is fired. Out that night, commiserating with Joanne, Lane discovers that Liam is a total fraud and he has lied about everything. In reality, he is a waiter at a restaurant. Lane realizes all her lying has caused her bad karma.

The next day, to her surprise, Tom calls her and tells her to get into the office to present the visuals at the big meeting. She does, and it goes well, but the boss informs all there that there are going to be major cut-backs and a closing of the entire department due to 'economic realities'. As all are down-faced, Lane speaks up to the boss, and advises Tom to pitch his ideas about 'going green' to save a lot of money. The boss listens and asks for more details to be delivered later.  Everyone is happy Tom has saved the department.
Lane apologizes to Seth, and he confesses he could never do the things she described in her article, as he is allergic to chocolate.

Tom and Lane part, he wishing her luck about her article. She is depressed, as the outcome she was hoping for did not materialize, and the article assigned to her is not what she now has. Lane also realizes the search for a 'magic man' is a pointless fantasy, and that real love is not about perfection. Kate calls her in, and Lane thinks she will be fired again. Kate surprises her by informing her that the article is now a cover story. Kate tells her the real story was about how Lane had 'to figure things out for herself'. Kate also cleverly makes Lane sheepishly realize Tom is the magic man she has been looking for. She runs to his office to find him, and professes her love for him. He replies he loves her too, and they embrace and kiss.

Lane's next Cosmo article is about 'how to help your boyfriend become more fashion savvy'. Tom's 'greening division' is a success, and she helps him out with his presentations from time to time. Lane finally finds her "perfect" man in Tom, who she really loves, especially due to his quirky personality.

Cast
 Hilary Duff as Lane Daniels 
 Michael McMillian as Tom Rinehart
 Chris Carmack as Liam 
 Jaime Pressly as Kate White
 Matt Dallas as Seth 
 Amanda Walsh as Joanne
 Kevin Kirkpatrick as John
 Brandi Coleman as Amèlie
 James McDaniel as Mr. Belmont

Cameo appearances
 Jennifer Coolidge as Felisa McCollin
 Tarik Naim Alherimi as Rodrigo Navarro
 Courtney J. Clark as Margo
 Lacey Minchew as Whitney
 Carol Sutton as recruiter
 Billy Slaughter as accountant

Production
In August 2009, ABC Family announced that Hilary Duff would star in an upcoming romantic comedy for the network, which was initially titled The Business of Falling in Love. The film is based on the novel Diary of a Working Girl by Daniella Brodsky, and was adapted for television by writer Mike Horowitz. In addition to starring, Duff executive produced the film alongside Frank von Zerneck, Robert Sertner, Ira Pincus, and Jessica Horowitz.

The two-hour original film was directed by Gil Junger, and filming occurred in late 2009, with portions shot in New York City in October and in New Orleans in November.

The film had a rating of 2.4 million viewers on its April 18, 2010, broadcast and attracted a strong female audience of ages 12–34. It marks a collaboration between ABC Family and Cosmopolitan magazine, which is featured in the film.

Home media
The film was released on DVD and Blu-ray in the United States on February 8, 2011.

Awards and nominations

References

External links
 
 

2010s English-language films
2010 television films
2010 films
2010 romantic comedy films
ABC Family original films
American romantic comedy films
Films about fashion
Films about journalists
Films based on American novels
Films directed by Gil Junger
Films set in New York City
Films shot in New Orleans
Films shot in New York City
2010s American films